Elections to Barnsley Metropolitan Borough Council were held simultaneously with the general election on 3 May 1979. Following boundary changes that increased the number of wards by two to 22, with an additional 6 seats to 66 respectively), the entirety of the council was up for election. Labour retained control of the council.

Election result

This resulted in the following composition of the council:

Ward results

By-elections between 1979 and 1980

References

Barnsley Metropolitan Borough Council election
1979
1970s in South Yorkshire